Man with an Accordion is a 1985 Soviet drama film directed by Nikolay Dostal.

Plot 
Dmitry Gromtsev broke up with his girlfriend as a result of the war. He was wounded and because of this refused to perform in operetta. But the love of domestic music and the desire to do good turned out to be stronger than circumstances.

Cast 
 Valeriy Zolotukhin
 Irina Alfyorova
 Arina Aleynikova
 Vladimir Soshalsky
 Mikhail Pugovkin
 Sergei Milovanov
 Elena Pletneva
 Stanislav Sadalskiy	
 Lyubov Malinovskaya
 Yevgeny Yevstigneev

References

External links 
 

1985 films
1980s Russian-language films
Soviet drama films
1985 drama films